Acta Politica is a quarterly peer-reviewed academic journal covering political science published by Palgrave Macmillan on behalf of the Dutch Political Science Association. The editors-in-chief are Benjamin Leruth (University of Groningen) and Emilie van Haute (Université libre de Bruxelles).

The journal covers such sub-areas as Dutch and comparative politics, as well as international relations, political theory, public administration and political communication.

Abstracting and indexing 
The journal is abstracted and indexed in International Bibliography of the Social Sciences, International Bibliography of Periodical Literature on the Humanities and Social Sciences, International Bibliography of Book Reviews of Scholarly Literature and Social Sciences, ProQuest databases, Scopus, Social Sciences Citation Index, CSA Sociological Abstracts, and CSA Worldwide Political Science Abstracts. According to the Journal Citation Reports, the journal has a 2020 impact factor of 2.404.

References

External links 
 

Political science journals
Publications established in 2006
English-language journals
Quarterly journals
Palgrave Macmillan academic journals
Academic journals associated with learned and professional societies